The 2015 Cyprus Women's Cup was the eighth edition of the Cyprus Women's Cup, an invitational women's football tournament held annually in Cyprus. It took place from 4–11 March 2015.

Venues

Squads

Group stage
Teams were placed into three groups of four. New Zealand were originally drawn in Group C, but later withdrew and were replaced by South Africa.

Tie-breaking criteria
For the group stage of this tournament, where two or more teams in a group tied on an equal number of points, the finishing positions will be determined by the following tie-breaking criteria in the following order:
 number of points obtained in the matches among the teams in question
 goal difference in all the group matches
 number of goals scored in all the group matches
 drawing of lots

Group A

Group B

Group C

Knockout stage

Eleventh place match

Ninth place match

Seventh place match

Fifth place match

Third place match

Final

Final standings

Goalscorers
5 goals
 Kim Little

3 goals
 Jodie Taylor

2 goals

 Ashleigh Sykes
 Emily van Egmond
 Yana Daniels
 Christine Sinclair
 Eniola Aluko
 Lianne Sanderson
 Cristiana Girelli
 Alia Guagni
 Charlyn Corral
 Jermaine Seoposenwe

1 goal

 Larissa Crummer
 Lisa De Vanna
 Kathryn Gill
 Katrina Gorry
 Michelle Heyman
 Clare Polkinghorne
 Tessa Wullaert
 Candace Chapman
 Jessie Fleming
 Pavla Benýrová
 Jitka Chlastáková
 Irena Martínková
 Lucie Voňková
 Jessica Clarke
 Juliette Kemppi
 Maija Saari
 Anna Westerlund
 Barbara Bonansea
 Valentina Cernoia
 Stefania Tarenzi
 Ji So-yun
 Yeo Min-ji
 Yoo Young-a
 Yamile Franco
 Stephany Mayor
 Teresa Noyola
 Veronica Perez
 Anouk Hoogendijk
 Vivianne Miedema
 Emma Mitchell
 Christie Murray

References

External links
Official website

2015
Cyprus Cup
Cyprus Cup